

Archosauromorphs

Newly named dinosaurs
Data courtesy of George Olshevsky's dinosaur genera list.

Synapsids

Newly named mammals

Afrotherians

References

1830s in paleontology
Paleontology